is a Japanese long-distance runner. At the 2012 Summer Olympics, he competed in the Men's 5000 metres, finished 26th overall in Round 1, and thus failed to qualify for the final.  He also competed in the men's 10000 metres, finishing in 22nd place.

International competitions

References

1986 births
Living people
People from Shimizu, Shizuoka
Sportspeople from Shizuoka Prefecture
Japanese male long-distance runners
Olympic male long-distance runners
Olympic athletes of Japan
Athletes (track and field) at the 2012 Summer Olympics
Asian Games competitors for Japan
Athletes (track and field) at the 2014 Asian Games
Competitors at the 2005 Summer Universiade
World Athletics Championships athletes for Japan
Japan Championships in Athletics winners